Epidendrum embreei ("Embree's Epidendrum") is a species of orchid in the genus Epidendrum.

embreei
Plants described in 1982